How the Other Half Dies: The Real Reasons for World Hunger is a book by Franco-American activist Susan George, a member of the Transnational Institute. It was originally published in 1976, not long after the World Food Conference, and has been reprinted several times since. 

In the book, George examines and disputes two popular ideas: first, that there is not enough food, and second, that the world is over-populated. She argues that the planet could easily feed its present population and many more. She also insists that the problem is not climate change and that food technology will not provide the solution. George instead believes that the problem is that the world food supply is controlled by the wealthy elite and that the poor have no say on the unfair trade that roots out local farmers, who are replaced with foreign agribusinesses to grow profitable cash crops for the West, creating economic, agricultural, and hunger crises in the third world.

The title is a reference to Jacob Riis's book How the Other Half Lives.

References

External links
 How the Other Half Dies, available for free download at Transnational Institute.

1976 non-fiction books
Books about poverty
Hunger